"Going to America" is the series finale of the Channel 4 sitcom Father Ted. It is the eighth episode of the third series, and the 25th episode overall. Dermot Morgan, who played the show's title character, died the day after filming was completed.

Synopsis

After Ted prevents a depressed Father Kevin (Tommy Tiernan) from jumping to his death at the "It's Great Being a Priest" conference, an American priest, Father Buzz Cagney (Jeff Harding), asks him if he will come to a parish in Los Angeles. Ted cannot wait and excitedly tells Jack, Dougal and Mrs. Doyle, who incorrectly think they will be able to come with him. Ted does not have the heart to tell them otherwise and brings them to the airport, dumping them there while he gets on the plane. However, Ted has second thoughts when Buzz mentions the gang culture around Ted's new parish in Los Angeles and its violent state. Realising he is in serious trouble, Ted abandons going on his trip and rejoins Jack, Dougal and Mrs Doyle. It transpires that the three of them never wanted to go to the States anyway, with the possible exception of Jack, who yells 'Feck!' when he learns of what has gone wrong, though the promise of a drink cheers him up. The group leaves the airport and heads for home, and Ted resigns himself to the fact he is probably never going to escape Craggy Island. The scene then transits to a montage of moments from every episode of the series in reverse order, ending with Ted and Dougal wishing each other goodnight.

Alternative ending
The episode was always intended to be the last Father Ted; in the original script, the last scene was to be set at the "It's Still Great Being a Priest" conference with Father Kevin once again on the window ledge and once again Ted arriving on the ledge, except this time it is not to stop him from jumping but to join him, because he was depressed that the intended trip to America fell through and he would have to stay on Craggy Island forever. This ending was abandoned in favour of a montage of clips from all three series of the show. The writers had initial concerns that their original conclusion would not work – Morgan's sudden death confirmed their decision to drop the ending, with the idea now seeming especially tacky.

The episode was filmed on 27 February 1998. Dermot Morgan died from a heart attack the following day, at age 45.

Production
This episode does not normally contain a credits sequence at the end, as it is replaced by the clips montage. The episode's guest cast is listed alongside the lead actors in the opening credits.

While filming the scene in which Ted dances to "Theme from Shaft," Tommy Tiernan continually flubbed his lines. As a result, Dermot Morgan was required to perform the dance repeatedly, despite pains in his heart. In a 2009 interview, Tiernan speculated that this contributed to Morgan's fatal heart attack the following day.

Montage clips
A clip is shown from each episode, in reverse order of airdate.
 Mrs Doyle fainting ("Night of the Nearly Dead")
 Ted kicking Bishop Brennan up the arse ("Kicking Bishop Brennan Up the Arse")
 Ted shouting at the soccer team ("Escape from Victory")
 A crow stealing Jack's glasses ("The Mainland")
 Dougal driving the milkfloat ("Speed 3")
 Chris on a boat, watched by Ted and Dougal ("Chirpy Burpy Cheap Sheep")
 Ted inadvertently resembling Hitler ("Are You Right There, Father Ted?")
 Mrs Doyle falling off the windowsill ("A Christmassy Ted")
 "It's me. In the nip. With a dog." ("Flight into Terror")
 Mrs Doyle showing "GO ON" flashcards to Fr Stack ("New Jack City")
 Ted injured by a cross ("Cigarettes and Alcohol and Rollerblading")
 Imelda winning the Lovely Girls competition ("Rock-a-Hula Ted")
 Tom "taking care" of a toy rabbit ("The Plague")
 Part of the "My Lovely Horse" music video ("Song for Europe")
 "Picnic Area" sign hitting Ted ("The Old Grey Whistle Theft")
 Mrs Doyle bathes Dougal ("Tentacles of Doom")
 The Dancing Priest ("Think Fast, Father Ted")
 Ted, Jack and Dougal in the wrong caravan ("Hell")
 The Monkey Priest throwing books around ("Grant unto Him Eternal Rest")
 Ted being shocked by Polly's tale ("And God Created Woman")
 The Third Age of Elvis ("Competition Time")
 "Down With This Sort Of Thing" and "Careful Now" ("The Passion of St Tibulus")
 Fr Stone on the toilet, Ted in the bath ("Entertaining Father Stone")
 Ted on the 'Crane of Death' ("Good Luck, Father Ted")
The final shot is an exterior view of the parochial house at dusk. Ted and Dougal say goodnight to each other (stock audio from the episode "New Jack City") and the light in their bedroom is switched off.

References

External links

 

Father Ted episodes
British television series finales
1998 British television episodes
Television episodes about mental health
Fiction with alternate endings